A Swingin' Affair is a 1962 album by saxophonist Dexter Gordon, recorded two days after Go!, and with the same line-up.

Recording and music
The album was recorded at Van Gelder Studio, Englewood Cliffs, New Jersey, on August 29, 1962. Gordon's quartet contained pianist Sonny Clark, bassist Butch Warren, and drummer Billy Higgins. Of the six compositions, three are standards, two were written by Gordon, and one was contributed by Warren.

Release and reception

A Swingin' Affair was released in early October 1964. The Penguin Guide to Jazz picked "You Stepped Out of a Dream" as the album's highlight, but described the session as a "not altogether riveting date".

Track listing
"Soy Califa" (Gordon) – 6:27
"Don't Explain" (Herzog Jr., Holiday) – 6:06
"You Stepped Out of a Dream" (Brown, Kahn) – 6:34
"The Backbone" (Butch Warren) – 6:48
"Until the Real Thing Comes Along" (Cahn, Chaplin, L.E. Freeman, Mann Holiner, Alberta Nichols) – 6:49
"McSplivens" (Gordon) – 5:43

Personnel
Dexter Gordon – tenor saxophone
Sonny Clark – piano
Butch Warren – bass
Billy Higgins – drums

References

1964 albums
Dexter Gordon albums
Blue Note Records albums